Spira Grujić (born 7 December 1971) is a Serbian former footballer who played as a defender.

Club career
After spending four seasons with Radnički Niš, Grujić moved abroad and joined Belgian club Molenbeek in 1995. He would also play for Anderlecht, before transferring to Dutch side Twente in 1998. Over the next six seasons, Grujić played 146 league games and scored two goals. He subsequently signed with ADO Den Haag and stayed with the club for two years. After spending six months without a club, Grujić joined Rad in his homeland during the 2007 winter transfer window.

International career
Grujić made his solo international appearance for FR Yugoslavia in a 2–1 friendly win away against Northern Ireland on 16 August 2000.

Honours
Twente
 KNVB Cup: 2000–01

References

External links
 
 
 

1971 births
Living people
Sportspeople from Pristina
Kosovo Serbs
Yugoslav footballers
Serbia and Montenegro footballers
Serbian footballers
Association football defenders
Serbia and Montenegro international footballers
FK Radnički Niš players
R.W.D. Molenbeek players
R.S.C. Anderlecht players
FC Twente players
ADO Den Haag players
FK Rad players
Yugoslav First League players
First League of Serbia and Montenegro players
Belgian Pro League players
Eredivisie players
Serbian First League players
Serbia and Montenegro expatriate footballers
Expatriate footballers in Belgium
Expatriate footballers in the Netherlands
Serbia and Montenegro expatriate sportspeople in Belgium
Serbia and Montenegro expatriate sportspeople in the Netherlands